Right shift may refer to:

Logical right shift, a computer operation
Arithmetic right shift, a computer operation
Right Shift key, a key on a computer keyboard
Rightshiting (cultural change), changing mindsets away from overly analytical to more synergistic (also known as the Marshall Model)

See also 
 Left shift (disambiguation)